Rosemary F. G. Wyse  (born 26 January 1957 in Dundee, Scotland) is a Scottish astrophysicist and professor in the physics and astronomy department at Johns Hopkins University.

Education
Wyse graduated from Queen Mary University of London in 1977 with a Bachelor of Science degree in Physics and Astrophysics and obtained her PhD in Astrophysics in the Institute of Astronomy at the University of Cambridge in 1983. Bernard Jones was her academic advisor.

Career
Wyse conducted postdoctoral research at Princeton University and the University of California Berkeley. Her work has primarily been in the fields of galactic formation, composition and evolution.

Honors and awards
1986 Annie Jump Cannon Award in Astronomy of the American Astronomical Society
 2016 Blaauw professor, Kapteyn Astronomical Institute
 2016 Brouwer Award of the American Astronomical Society

Wyse is a fellow of the Royal Astronomical Society and a member of the American Physical Society, American Association for the Advancement of Science, and the American Astronomical Society.

References

1957 births
Living people
Scottish astronomers
Women astronomers
Recipients of the Annie J. Cannon Award in Astronomy
Alumni of Queen Mary University of London
Alumni of the University of Cambridge
Scottish women scientists
Johns Hopkins University faculty
20th-century Scottish scientists
21st-century Scottish scientists
Scottish women academics
Fellows of the Royal Astronomical Society
Fellows of the American Physical Society
Fellows of the American Association for the Advancement of Science
Fellows of the American Astronomical Society
British expatriate academics in the United States
Scottish emigrants to the United States
20th-century Scottish women